Cibyra spitzi is a species of moth of the family Hepialidae. It is known from Brazil.

References

External links
Hepialidae genera

Moths described in 1956
Hepialidae
Moths of South America